The Basilica of Panagia Limeniotissa() is a ruined basilica in Paphos, Cyprus. It was built at the beginning of the 5th century and it is dedicated to "Our Lady of the Harbour".

The basilica of Panagia Limeniotissa is situated in a short distance north of Paphos harbour, close to the restaurants of the harbour and it is part of the Paphos Archaeological Park. Visitors can see some colourful mosaics and a few restored columns.

History

Medieval period
The basilica was built in the early 5th century, during the Early Christian period, when Cyprus was part of the Byzantine empire. It originally comprised three aisles with two rows of marble columns, an apse and a narthex. The floors and walls were decorated with coloured mosaics in geometric patterns.

In 653 AD, it was almost destroyed during the Arab raids against the island. The Arabs maintained a garrison, using the structure as workshops, stables and living quarters for the army. They also built a tower in its narthex which could have served as a watchtower, lighthouse or a minaret. In 688 AD, after they evacuated the island, the church was restored as a three-aisled barrel vaulted basilica in a smaller scale than the previous one.

In 1159 AD, the basilica was destroyed again. This time, according to St. Neophytos, an earthquake destroyed the church as well as thirteen churches in the whole district of Paphos.
In the following years a smaller structure was built upon the ruins of the basilica but it was also destroyed by the 1222 earthquake.

The church was left in ruins and forgotten.

20th Century
The exact location of the basilica was unknown among the other ruins of Nea Paphos ("New Paphos") until the 20th century. The Panagia Limeniotissa was first discovered in 1937 and was officially excavated in 1959. Today, the Panagia Limeniotissa basilica is part of Paphos Archaeological Park which is a UNESCO World Heritage Site.

References

External links
 History of Church of Paphos

Paphos
Byzantine church buildings in Cyprus
Former churches in Cyprus
5th-century churches
Archaeological sites in Cyprus